Alex Zaliauskas (born 20 April 1971 in Toronto) is a Canadian retired high jumper.

Zaliauskas competed at the 1991 World Championships, the 1992 Olympic Games, the 1993 World Indoor Championships and the 1993 World Championships without reaching the final.

Zaliauskas's personal best jump is 2.31 metres, achieved in July 1991 in New York.
Zaliauskas was a member of the '90 Commonwealth Games team before competing in '92 at the Barcelona Olympics.  Zaliauskas's talents also shone as a student athlete, where he continued to dominate winning 5 CIAU titles while still holding both OUA and U Sports records.

References

External links

1971 births
Living people
Athletes from Toronto
Athletes (track and field) at the 1990 Commonwealth Games
Commonwealth Games competitors for Canada
Athletes (track and field) at the 1992 Summer Olympics
Canadian male high jumpers
Canadian people of Lithuanian descent
Olympic track and field athletes of Canada
Track and field athletes from Ontario
World Athletics Championships athletes for Canada
20th-century Canadian people
21st-century Canadian people